Jerzy Janicki may refer to:

 Jerzy Janicki (1928–2007), Polish writer
 Jerzy Stanisław Janicki (born 1956), Polish physicist